Joseph Robinette "Beau" Biden III (February 3, 1969 – May 30, 2015) was an American politician, lawyer, and officer in the Army Judge Advocate General's Corps from Wilmington, Delaware. The oldest child of current U.S. president Joe Biden and Neilia Hunter Biden, he served as the 44th attorney general of Delaware from 2007 to 2015 and was a major in the Delaware Army National Guard in the Iraq War. He died of glioblastoma in 2015 at the age of 46.

Early life and family 

Joseph Robinette "Beau" Biden III was born in Wilmington, Delaware, on February 3, 1969. He was the first son of Joe Biden (who would become a U.S. senator, vice president, and president),  and his first wife Neilia. On December 18, 1972, Beau's mother and infant sister Naomi were killed in an automobile accident while Christmas shopping. Beau was just under four years old, and his brother, Hunter, was just under three years old. Beau and Hunter were in the car when the crash took place and were critically injured but survived. Beau sustained multiple broken bones, while Hunter sustained injuries to his skull and severe traumatic brain damage. They spent several months in the hospital, where their father was sworn into the Senate two weeks after the accident.

According to some accounts, Beau and Hunter encouraged their father to marry again, even going so far as to ask him "when were 'we' going to get married". In June 1977, his father married Jill Jacobs, whom Beau welcomed as a stepmother. His half-sister, Ashley, was born in 1981.

Beau Biden married Hallie Olivere in 2002. They had two children: daughter Natalie Naomi (b. 2004), and son Robert Hunter II (b. 2006).

Career
Biden graduated from Archmere Academy, his father's high school alma mater, and the University of Pennsylvania in 1991, where he was a member of the Psi Upsilon fraternity. He was also a graduate of Syracuse University College of Law, as was his father. After graduating from law school, he clerked for Judge Steven McAuliffe of the United States District Court of New Hampshire. From 1995 to 2004, he worked at the United States Department of Justice in Philadelphia, first as Counsel to the Office of Policy Development and later as a federal prosecutor in the U.S. Attorney's Office.

Biden was in Kosovo after the 1998-1999 Kosovo War, working on behalf of the OSCE to train judges and prosecutors for the local judicial system. In 2004 he became a partner in the law firm of Bifferato, Gentilotti, Biden & Balick, where he worked for two years before being elected Attorney General of Delaware.

When Joe Biden was nominated for Vice President at the 2008 Democratic National Convention, Beau introduced him. Many delegates wept at his speech, which recounted the auto accident that killed his mother and sister and the subsequent commitment his father made to his sons.

Military service 
Biden joined the Delaware Army National Guard in 2003 and attended The JAG School at the University of Virginia. He attained the rank of major in the Judge Advocate General's Corps as part of the 261st Signal Brigade in Smyrna, Delaware.

Biden's unit was activated to deploy to Iraq on October 3, 2008 and sent to Fort Bliss, Texas for pre-deployment training. This was the day after his father participated in the 2008 presidential campaign's only vice presidential debate. His father was on the record as saying, "I don't want him going. But I tell you what, I don't want my grandson or my granddaughters going back in 15 years, and so how we leave makes a big difference."

Biden traveled to Washington, D.C. from Iraq in January 2009 for the presidential inauguration and his father's swearing-in as vice president, then returned to Iraq. Biden received a visit at Camp Victory from his father on July 4, 2009.

Biden returned from Iraq in September 2009 after completing his yearlong stint on active duty which included a 7-month deployment in the combat zone. During his deployment he announced that he would continue to actively serve as Delaware's attorney general by working in conjunction with his office's senior staff in Delaware, although a member of his unit related that Biden said he had turned over most of his attorney general work to his deputy in order to focus on his duties in Iraq.

Biden was awarded the Bronze Star Medal for his service in Iraq. Army Chief of Staff Raymond Odierno delivered the eulogy at Biden's funeral and presented a posthumous Legion of Merit for his service in the Delaware National Guard, stating "Beau Biden possessed the traits I have witnessed in only the greatest leaders." He was also posthumously presented with the Delaware Conspicuous Service Cross, which is "awarded for heroism, meritorious service and outstanding achievement".

Political career 

In his first bid for political office, Biden ran for attorney general of Delaware in 2006. Biden's opponent was a veteran state prosecutor and assistant U.S. attorney, Ferris Wharton. Major issues in the campaign included the candidates' experience and proposed efforts to address sex offenders, Internet predators, senior abuse and domestic abuse. Biden won the election by approximately five percentage points.

After being elected, he appointed former Delaware Attorney General and International Judge Richard S. Gebelein as Chief Deputy Attorney General, and former assistant U.S. Attorney Richard G. Andrews was appointed as State Prosecutor. As Attorney General, Biden supported and enforced stronger registration requirements for sex offenders.

Joe Biden resigned from the Senate following his 2008 election to the vice presidency. Governor Ruth Ann Minner named former Joe Biden aide Ted Kaufman to fill the vacant seat, but Kaufman made it clear that he would not be a candidate in the 2010 special election. It fueled speculation Beau would run at that time. Biden's father stated after the announcement of Kaufman's appointment, "It is no secret that I believe my son, Attorney General, would make a great United States Senator just as I believe he has been a great attorney general. But Beau has made it clear from the moment he entered public life that any office he sought he would earn on his own.... [I]f he chooses to run for the Senate in the future, he will have to run and win on his own. He wouldn't have it any other way."

In October 2009, Biden stated that he was considering a run for the Senate and that he would make a final decision in January. On January 25, Biden confirmed that he would forgo a Senate run so as to better focus on the prosecution of Earl Bradley, a convicted serial child rapist.

On November 2, 2010, he was easily re-elected to a second term as Delaware Attorney General, beating Independent Party of Delaware candidate Doug Campbell by a large margin.

Biden was criticized for his handling of the prosecution of Robert H. Richards IV, an heir of the powerful Delaware-based Du Pont family accused of sexually assaulting his young daughter. In 2008, Biden's office charged Richards with two counts of second-degree rape, charges punishable by a minimum of 20 years in prison, but later that year, his office entered a plea bargain with Richards in which Richards pleaded guilty to one count of fourth-degree rape and was sentenced by Judge Jan Jurden to eight years' probation. Defending the plea bargain and Jurden's sentencing in a letter to The News Journal, Biden wrote "This was not a strong case, and a loss at trial was a distinct possibility" and said the judge "exercised sound discretion".

Biden did not seek election to a third term as attorney general in 2014. In the spring of that year, he announced his intention to run for governor of Delaware in the 2016 election to succeed term-limited Democratic Governor Jack Markell. At the time of this announcement, the cancer that would kill Biden in 2015 had been diagnosed (in 2013), but was in remission.

Illness and death 

According to his father, Beau was diagnosed with ankylosing spondylitis in 2001 after returning from service in Kosovo. He was later diagnosed with brain cancer, which his father believes was possibly a consequence of exposure to military burn pits in Iraq. 

For the final few years of his life, Biden suffered from a brain tumor. In May 2010, he was admitted to Christiana Hospital in Newark, Delaware, after complaining of a headache, numbness, and paralysis. Officials stated that he had suffered a mild stroke. Later that month, Biden was transferred to Thomas Jefferson University Hospital in Philadelphia and kept for observation for several days.

In August 2013, Biden was admitted to the University of Texas MD Anderson Cancer Center in Houston and diagnosed with glioblastoma multiforme, an aggressive type of brain cancer, after experiencing what White House officials called "an episode of disorientation and weakness". A lesion was removed at that time. Biden had radiation and chemotherapy treatments and the cancer remained stable. On May 20, 2015, he was admitted to Walter Reed National Military Medical Center in Bethesda, Maryland, because of a recurrence of brain cancer. He died there ten days later, on May 30, 2015, at the age of 46. His funeral was held at St. Anthony of Padua Roman Catholic Church in Wilmington, Delaware, on June 6, 2015.

Biden's funeral was attended by then President Barack Obama, First Lady Michelle Obama, their daughters Malia and Sasha, former President Bill Clinton, former Secretary of State and former First Lady Hillary Clinton, former US Army Chief of Staff General Ray Odierno, and then-Senate Majority Leader Mitch McConnell. At his funeral, he was awarded the Legion of Merit Award by General Odierno, for his services in the Iraq War. President Obama described Biden as "an original. He was a good man. He did in 46 years what most of us couldn't do in 146." At his funeral service, a solo rendition of the song "Til Kingdom Come" was performed by Chris Martin, the lead singer of the band Coldplay, of whom Beau had been a fan.<ref>{{cite news|last=Blistein|first=Jon|date=June 7, 2015|title=Chris Martin Performs Til Kingdom Come' for Beau Biden|magazine=Rolling Stone|url=https://www.rollingstone.com/music/news/chris-martin-honors-beau-biden-with-poignant-til-kingdom-come-20150607|access-date=December 18, 2020|archive-date=September 12, 2017|archive-url=https://web.archive.org/web/20170912102324/https://www.rollingstone.com/music/news/chris-martin-honors-beau-biden-with-poignant-til-kingdom-come-20150607|url-status=dead}}</ref>

Beau Biden was buried at St. Joseph on the Brandywine in Greenville, Delaware. His gravesite is near the graves of his grandparents Joe Sr. and Catherine, his mother Neilia and his sister Naomi.

 Posthumous awards and legacy 

On November 4, 2015, Biden was posthumously awarded the Albert Schweitzer Leadership Award, the highest honor given by the Hugh O'Brian Youth Leadership Foundation (HOBY), for his service to mankind. A portion of the 21st Century Cures Act (2016) was named the "Beau Biden Cancer Moonshot" initiative after him. A named scholarship was established at Syracuse University College of Law in 2016.

In August 2016, Joe Biden, his sister Valerie Biden Owens and son Hunter attended a ceremony that renamed a southeastern Kosovar highway "Joseph R. 'Beau' Biden, III" to honour Beau's contribution to Kosovo for training its judges and prosecutors. That year the Major Joseph R. "Beau" Biden III National Guard/Reserve Center in New Castle, Delaware was named in his honor. On November 14, 2017, Joe Biden published a memoir titled Promise Me, Dad: A Year of Hope, Hardship, and Purpose'', where he reflects on Beau Biden's illness and death.

On March 2, 2020, Joe Biden mentioned Beau in a speech, comparing him to former South Bend Mayor, Pete Buttigieg, after Buttigieg endorsed Biden for the 2020 presidential election.The Major Joseph R. "Beau" Biden III National Guard/Reserve Center, named for Biden, is in New Castle, Delaware; it was the site of a speech by Joe Biden the day before his inauguration where he stated "we should be introducing him (Beau) as president".

On January 20, 2021, the day his father was sworn in as president, the band New Radicals reunited for the first time in 22 years to perform their 1998 hit song "You Get What You Give" during an inauguration performance. The song was a favorite of Beau's and at his 2015 funeral his sister Ashley recited the lyrics in her eulogy. The band had rejected offers to perform over the past 22 years but wanted to honor this day and honor Beau. "We pledged if Joe [Biden] won, we’d get together and play our little song both in memory and in honor of our new president’s patriot son Beau and also with the prayer of Joe being able to bring our country together again with compassion, honesty and justice for a change,” singer Gregg Alexander said prior to their performance.

Notes

References

External links 

 
 
 
 

1969 births
2015 deaths
United States Army personnel of the Iraq War
American people of English descent
American people of French descent
American people of Irish descent
Biden family
Burials in New Castle County, Delaware
Catholics from Delaware
Children of presidents of the United States
Children of vice presidents of the United States
Deaths from brain cancer in the United States
Deaths from glioblastoma
Delaware Attorneys General
Delaware Democrats
Delaware lawyers
Delaware National Guard personnel
United States Army Judge Advocate General's Corps
The Judge Advocate General's Legal Center and School alumni
Military personnel from Delaware
National Guard (United States) officers
People with ankylosing spondylitis
People from Wilmington, Delaware
People involved in road accidents or incidents
Prosecutors
Syracuse University College of Law alumni
United States Army officers
University of Pennsylvania alumni
Psi Upsilon
Recipients of the Legion of Merit